The Constitution (Twenty-eighth Amendment) Act, 2017 was a proposed amendment to the Constitution of Pakistan which aimed to restore military courts. The amendment would be an extension of the expired Twenty-first Amendment to the Constitution of Pakistan.

It was never adopted and never officially became part of the constitution.

References

Amendments to the Constitution of Pakistan
2017 in Pakistani law
Acts of the Parliament of Pakistan